

U

References

Lists of words